Conchita Martínez Granados (born 20 January 1976) is a former professional female tennis player from Spain.

WTA career finals

Singles: 1 (0–1)

Doubles: 3 (0–3)

ITF Circuit finals

Singles (12–8)

Doubles (17–24)

Grand Slam performance timelines

Singles

References

External links
 
 

1976 births
Living people
Sportswomen from Catalonia
Spanish female tennis players
Tennis players from Barcelona